Long Ambients 1: Calm. Sleep. is the twelfth studio album by American electronica musician Moby. It was released on February 25, 2016, as a free download on his Little Pine restaurant Web site and his own Web site. The album consists of around four hours of recordings Moby produced for his own personal listening, and which he subsequently made available for downloading and streaming, without cost or licensing. In March 2019, Moby released a follow-up ambient album, Long Ambients 2, which also consist the long-hour of ambient music.

Critical reception
Paul Simpson of AllMusic viewed the album positively, calling it an "incredibly beautiful, immersive listening experience". He felt that the tracks were easy to "get lost in, or maybe succumb to, as it feels like there's no way out", while working "magnificently" as sleeping or relaxing music to calm listeners down.

Track listing

Charts

See also
 Sleep, album by Max Richter created to fit a full night's sleep
 Music and sleep

References

External links

 

2016 albums
Moby albums
Ambient albums by American artists
Albums free for download by copyright owner
Self-released albums